Lucido is a given name and a surname. 

Notable people with the given name include:
Lucido Parocchi (1833–1903), Italian Roman Catholic cardinal 

Notable people with the surname include:
Jeremy Lucido (born 1977), American artist, blogger, photographer, zine publisher, and film director
Lance Lucido (born 2007), Filipino actor and dancer
Maria Silvia Lucido (1963–2008), Italian mathematician
Peter Lucido (born 1960), American politician